Joel W. Brown (born August 10, 1964) is an American Democratic politician from Iowa. He served in the Iowa House of Representatives from 1988 to 1992, representing House District 67, comprising Lucas, Wayne, Monroe, and Clark counties.

References

Living people
Democratic Party members of the Iowa House of Representatives
20th-century American politicians
1964 births